Chahe is a town in Changjiang Li Autonomous County, China's Hainan province. , it administers Chahe Residential Community and the following seven villages:
Chahe Village
Pai'an Village
Tang Village
Laohong Village
Laoyangdi Village
Kantou Village
Hongyang Village

Chahe Railway Station, a junction on the Hainan Western Ring Railway, is located in town.

References

Changjiang Li Autonomous County
Township-level divisions of Hainan